Jurgita Dronina (born 27 March 1986) is a Russian-Lithuanian ballet dancer. She is a principal dancer with the National Ballet of Canada, having previously danced with Royal Swedish Ballet, Dutch National Ballet and English National Ballet.

Early life
Born in Saratov, USSR, Dronina and her family moved to Vilnius, Lithuania when she was four. She started out studying ballroom dancing, and then moved on to gymnastics. When she was nine, a choreographer suggested that she try ballet. She attended the Čiurlionis School of Art in Vilnius and the Hochschule für Musik und Theater in Munich.

Career
In 2005, Dronina joined the Royal Swedish Ballet in Stockholm, after she was spotted by the company's then-director, Madeleine Onne, at several competitions. She became a soloist in 2007. She has danced leading roles included Nikiya in La Bayadère (2006) and Juliet in MacMillan's Romeo and Juliet (2007). In 2009, when she was returning from Verona where she had danced Kitri in Don Quixote, she was asked at the last minute to perform Odette/Odile in Swan Lake as the scheduled performer was ill. She completed the assignment so successfully that she was promoted to principal dancer, at age 22.

In 2010, after she had again performed the role of Kitri as a guest artist in Amsterdam, artistic director Ted Brandsen was so impressed he offered her a contract with the Dutch National Ballet. As she was looking for a broader variety of works, she accepted the position. In 2011, she received the Dutch Zwaan (swan) award for her Aurora in The Sleeping Beauty.

In 2015, after Dronina contacted Karen Kain, the director of the National Ballet of Canada, she joined the company as a principal dancer. Dronina said she made the move as she wanted to have a good balance between classical works and new productions, and she believed Toronto is more suitable for her family. In 2017, after dancing Mary Skeaping's Giselle with the English National Ballet as a guest artist, she joined the company as a lead principal, but remained a principal dancer at the National Ballet of Canada. She spent her first six months with the English National Ballet in London, but then settled in Toronto. In 2020, the English national Ballet announced that Dronina will not return to the company in the 2020–21 season, but confirmed Dronina will continue to perform in Canada.

Dronina was a resident guest principal with Hong Kong Ballet between 2015 and 2017, which was directed by Onne. She had host and danced in a gala in Lithuania, her home country. She was awarded the Knight's Crosses of the Order for Merits to Lithuania in 2018. The same year on October 25 she was awarded the Baltic Assembly Prize for the Arts.

Critical reception
Reviewing La Sylphide, The Globe and Mail called her "an irresistible performer" and "there is sensuality in her movement that teeters between the creature and the woman." On her performance in Swan Lake, The Guardian wrote "her execution impeccably clean, not an ounce of energy wasted – there is something unreal about her."

Selected repertoire
Dronina's repertoire includes:

Personal life
Dronina is married to former Dutch National Ballet dancer Serguei Endinian, their son was born in 2012. The family resides in Toronto.

References

1986 births
Living people
Russian ballerinas
Lithuanian ballerinas
Prima ballerinas
People from Saratov
Dancers from Vilnius
National Ballet of Canada principal dancers
English National Ballet principal dancers
Dutch National Ballet principal dancers
Royal Swedish Ballet dancers
21st-century Russian ballet dancers
University of Music and Performing Arts Munich alumni
Lithuanian people of Russian descent
Lithuanian expatriates in Sweden
Lithuanian expatriates in the Netherlands
Lithuanian expatriates in Canada
Russian expatriates in Sweden
Russian expatriates in the Netherlands
Russian expatriates in Canada
Knight's Crosses of the Order for Merits to Lithuania